2019 Thai League 3 Upper Region is the 3rd season of the Thai football league. It is a part of the Thai League 3 and the feeder league for the Thai League 2. A total of 14 teams will compete in the league this season.

Changes from last season

Team changes

Promoted clubs

Three clubs were promoted from the 2018 Thai League 4
 Khonkaen United

Two clubs were promoted to the 2019 Thai League 2
 JL Chiangmai United
 Ayutthaya United

Relegated clubs

A club was relegated to the 2019 Thai League 4 Northeastern Region
 Kalasin

A club was relegated from the 2018 Thai League 2 
 Angthong

Moved clubs

Simork were moved from the Lower Region.

Withdrawn clubs
 Simork was suspended from the 2019 campaign after avoiding payment to athletes and team staff.

Teams

Stadium and locations

Foreign Players

League table

Positions by round

Results by match played

Results

Season statistics

Top scorers
As of 8 September 2019.

Hat-tricks

Attendance

Overall statistics

Attendance by home match played

Since 31 March 2019 Simork had suspended. But statistics of attendances are continue counting.

Source: Thai League 3 
Note: Some error of T3 official match report 21 August 2019 (Bangkok 2–2 Lamphun Warrior).

See also
 2019 Thai League 1
 2019 Thai League 2
 2019 Thai League 3
 2019 Thai League 4
 2019 Thai FA Cup
 2019 Thai League Cup
 2019 Thai League 3 Lower Region

References

 Thai League 3 Official Website

External links
Thai League 3 
smmsport.com

Thai League 3
2019 in Thai football leagues